Visa requirements for Bulgarian citizens are administrative entry restrictions by the authorities of other states placed on citizens of Bulgaria. As of January 1, 2023, Bulgarian citizens had visa-free or visa on arrival access to 174 countries and territories, ranking the Bulgarian passport 18th overall in terms of travel freedom according to the Henley & Partners Passport Index.



Visa requirements map

Visa requirements

Territories and disputed areas

Visa requirements for Bulgarian citizens for visits to various territories, disputed areas, partially recognized countries and restricted zones:

Visas for Cambodia, Myanmar, Rwanda, São Tomé and Príncipe, Senegal, Sri Lanka and Turkey are obtainable online.

Non-ordinary passports
Holders of various categories of official Bulgarian passports have additional visa-free access to the following countries – Azerbaijan (diplomatic or service passports), China (diplomatic or service passports), India (diplomatic or official passports), Indonesia (diplomatic or official passports), Iran (diplomatic or service passports), Kazakhstan (diplomatic or service passports), Kuwait (diplomatic or service passports), Mauritania (diplomatic and service passports), Mongolia (diplomatic or official passports), North Korea (diplomatic or service passports), Qatar (diplomatic passports), Russia (diplomatic and service passports), South Africa (diplomatic, official or service passports), Turkmenistan (diplomatic or service passports) and Vietnam (diplomatic, official, service or special passports). Holders of diplomatic or service passports of any country have visa-free access to Cape Verde, Ethiopia, Mali and Zimbabwe.

Right to consular protection in non-EU countries

When in a non-EU country where there is no Bulgarian embassy, Bulgarian citizens as EU citizens have the right to get consular protection from the embassy of any other EU country present in that country.

See also List of diplomatic missions of Bulgaria.

Non-visa restrictions

See also

Visa requirements for European Union citizens
Bulgarian passport

References and notes
References

Notes

Bulgaria
Foreign relations of Bulgaria